Blagovest Stoyanov (born March 21, 1968 in Asenovgrad) is a Bulgarian sprint canoer who competed in the 1990s. Competing in two Summer Olympics, he won a bronze in the C-2 500 m event at Barcelona in 1992.

Stoyanov's best world championship results also came in the C-2 with Marinov. At the 1994 championships in Mexico City, they won the C-2 500 m bronze medal. The following year, in Duisburg, they were again bronze medalists, this time in the C-2 200 m event.

References
DatabaseOlympics.com profile

Sports-reference.com profile

1968 births
Bulgarian male canoeists
Canoeists at the 1992 Summer Olympics
Canoeists at the 1996 Summer Olympics
Living people
Olympic canoeists of Bulgaria
Olympic bronze medalists for Bulgaria
Olympic medalists in canoeing
ICF Canoe Sprint World Championships medalists in Canadian
People from Asenovgrad
Medalists at the 1992 Summer Olympics